Sima Wei (司馬瑋) (271 – 26 July 291), courtesy name Yandu (彥度), formally Prince Yin of Chu (楚隱王), was an imperial prince during Jin Dynasty (266–420) and was the second of the eight princes commonly associated with the War of the Eight Princes.

Life

Sima Wei was the fifth son of Jin's founding emperor Emperor Wu, by his concubine Consort Shen. On 5 October 277, when he was about 6 years old, he was created the Prince of Shiping (始平王). Late in his father's reign, on 22 December 289, he was created the Prince of Chu and charged with the military commands of Jing Province (荊州, modern Hubei and Hunan).  After his father died in May 290, his brother Crown Prince Zhong ascended the throne as Emperor Hui.  Empress Dowager Yang's father Yang Jun was regent, but many people were dissatisfied with his hold on power.  One of those was Emperor Hui's wife Empress Jia Nanfeng, and she entered into a conspiracy with Sima Wei, among others, to overthrow Yang Jun.  In 291, Sima Wei returned to the capital Luoyang with his troops, and soon a coup happened.

Empress Jia, who had her husband easily under her control, had him issue an edict declaring that Yang Jun had committed crimes and should be removed from his posts. It also ordered Sima Wei and Sima Yao the Duke of Dong'an to attack Yang's forces and defend against counterattacks. Quickly, it became clear that Yang was in trouble. Empress Dowager Yang, trapped in the palace herself, wrote an edict ordering assistance for Yang Jun and put it on arrows, shooting it out of the palace. Empress Jia then made the bold declaration that Empress Dowager Yang was committing treason. Yang Jun was quickly defeated, and his clan was massacred.  Emperor Hui's granduncle Sima Liang was recalled to serve as regent, along with Wei Guan.

Sima Liang and Wei Guan had reservations about Sima Wei's ferocity in overthrowing Yang, and they therefore tried to strip him of his military command, but Sima Wei persuaded Empress Jia to let him keep his military command. Sima Wei's assistants Qi Sheng and Gongsun Hong thereafter falsely told Empress Jia that Sima Liang and Wei Guan planned to depose the emperor. Empress Jia, who had already resented Wei for having, during Emperor Wu's reign, suggested that he change his heir selection, also wanted more direct control over the government, and therefore resolved to plot a second coup.

In summer 291, Empress Jia had Emperor Hui personally write an edict to Sima Wei, ordering him to have Sima Liang and Wei removed from their offices. His forces thereby surrounded Sima Liang and Wei Guan's mansions, and while both men's subordinates recommended resistance, each declined and was captured. Against what the edict said, both were killed—Sima Liang with his heir Sima Ju and Wei Guan with nine of his sons and grandsons. Qi then suggested to Sima Wei to take the chance to kill Empress Jia's relatives and take over the government, but Sima Wei hesitated—and at the same time, Empress Jia came to two realizations: first, if it were realized she had ordered the killing of Sima Liang and Guan Wei it could bring a political firestorm; and second, that Sima Wei would not be easily controlled. She therefore publicly declared that Sima Wei had falsely issued the edict. Sima Wei's troops abandoned him, and he was captured and executed.  At the execution, he tried to show the edict to the official in charge of the execution, Liu Song, and Liu, knowing that Sima Wei had actually carried out the coup on Empress Jia's orders, was saddened, but still carried out the execution.  Gongsun Hong and Qi Sheng were also executed, along with their clans.

Despite his volatile temper, Sima Wei was known for his generosity, and he was greatly missed by the people.  In 301, after Empress Jia's death, he was posthumously rewarded with the office of a general, and his son Sima Fan, while not given the principality of Chu, was created the Prince of Xiangyang.

References

 Fang, Xuanling. Book of Jin (Jin Shu).

271 births
291 deaths
Jin dynasty (266–420) generals
Jin dynasty (266–420) imperial princes
Executed Jin dynasty (266–420) people
3rd-century executions
People executed by the Jin dynasty (266–420) by decapitation
Politicians from Luoyang
Executed people from Henan
Generals from Henan